This is a list of television programs formerly broadcast by the U.S. cable television channel G4.

Second iteration

Final programming

Original

 Xplay (2004–2013; 2013–2014 (reruns); 2021–2022)
 Attack of the Show! (2005–2013; 2021–2022)
 Invitation to Party (2021–2022)
 Ninja Warrior (Sasuke and Kunoichi) (2006–2012, 2021–2022 (reruns))
 Unbeatable Banzuke (2008–2010; 2021–2022 (reruns))
 G4 Vault (2021–2022)
 G4's Crash Course (2021–2022)
 G4 Specials (2002–2012; 2021–2022)
 Scott the Woz (2021–2022)
 Name Your Price (2022)
 G4 Gameday LCS (2022)
 Arena (2002–2005; 2022)
 Hey, Donna! (2022)
 God of Work (2022)

Acquired
 Starcade (2002–2004; 2021-2022)
 Takeshi's Castle Thailand (2021-2022)
 Viva La Dirt League (2022)
 Smosh (2022)

Former programming

Original
 Boosted (February–July 2021 (YouTube-exclusive); 2021–2022 (TV))

Original iteration

Former programming

Original 

 Blister (2002–2004)
 Cheat! (2002–2009)
 Cinematech (2002–2007)
 Filter (2002–2006)
 G4tv.com (2002–2005)
 Game Makers (2002–2005)
 Game On (2002–2004)
 Icons (2002–2007)
 Judgment Day (2002–2006)
 Players (2002–2004)
 Portal (2002–2004)
 Pulse (2002–2004)
 Sweat (2003–2005)
 The Electric Playground (2003–2006)
 Eye Drops (2004)
 Fresh Gear (2004)
 Future Fighting Machines (2004–2005)
 G4 Sports (2004–2005)
 Invent This! (2004; reruns)
 Nerd Nation (2004; reruns)
 The Screen Savers (2004–2005)
 Unscrewed with Martin Sargent (2004–2005)
 Cinematech: Nocturnal Emissions (2005–2007)
 Formula D (2005–2006)
 G4's Late Night Peepshow (2005–2006)
 G4's Training Camp (2005–2006)
 Street Fury (2005–2006)
 Video Game Vixens (2005)
 Wired For Sex (2006–2008)
 The Block (2007–2008)
 Boost Mobile MLG Pro Circuit (2007)
 Code Monkeys (2007–2008)
 Free Stuff (2007)
 Whacked Out Videos (2007–2009)
 Human Wrecking Balls (2008–2010; 2014; reruns)
 Hurl! (2008)
 Spaceballs: The Animated Series (2008)
 2 Months 2 Million (2009; 2014; reruns)
 American Ninja Warrior (2009–2013)
 Campus PD (2009–2012; 2012–2014; reruns)
 G4 Underground (2009)
 The International Sexy Ladies Show (2009–2010)
 Web Soup (2009–2011; 2014; reruns)
 It's Effin' Science (2010; 2014; reruns)
 Rated 'A' for Adult (2010–2011)
 That's Tough (2010; 2014; reruns)
 Bomb Patrol Afghanistan (2011–2013)
 G4's Proving Ground (2011; 2014; reruns)
 Jump City: Seattle (2011)
 Top 100 Video Games of All Time (2012 TV special)

Acquired 

 10 Play (2003–2004)
 Game Gods (2003–2004)
 Gamer.tv (2003–2004)
 Game Sauce (2003–2004)
 Hi-Score (2003–2004)
 Body Hits (2004)
 Robot Wars (2004–2006)
 Thunderbirds (2004)
 Call for Help (2005–2006)
 The Man Show (2005–2007)
 Brainiac: Science Abuse (2005–2008)
 Fastlane (2005)
 Happy Tree Friends (2005–2007)
 Star Trek (2005–2006)
 Star Trek: The Next Generation (2005–2006)
 Arrested Development (2006–2009)
 Banzai (2006–2007)
 Cheaters (2006–2012)
 Cops (2006–2014)
 The Jamie Kennedy Experiment (2006–2008)
 Super Big Product Fun Show (2007–2008)
 Totally Outrageous Behavior (2007–2010)
 Freaky (2008)
 Heroes (2008–2010, 2012–2014)
 The Peter Serafinowicz Show (2008–2009)
 Trigger Happy TV (2008–2009)
 Lost (2009–2010, 2012–2014)
 The Chaser's War on Everything (2009–2010)
 Viper's Creed (2009)
 Blade (2011)
 Iron Man (2011–2014)
 Quantum Leap (2011–2012, 2013)
 Wolverine (2011–2014)
 X-Men (2011–2014)
 Knight Rider (2012–2013)
 Street Patrol (2012–2013)
 Tremors: The Series (2012)
 Airwolf (2013)
 Voyagers! (2013)

Programming blocks 
 Expansion Pack (2002–2003)
 G4 Global Gamer (2003–2004)
 Real Time (2003–2005)
 Anime Unleashed (2004–2006) (originated on TechTV and later moved to G4techTV when the channel merged with G4)
 G-Spot (2004–2005)
 The Whip Set (2005)
 Barbed Wire Biscuit (2005–2006)
 Action Blast! (2006–2007)
 Duty Free TV (2006–2010)
 G4 Rewind (2008–2009)
 Junk Food TV (2009–2010)

Movie presentations 
 Movies That Don't Suck (2008–2012; films were unbranded after 2012)

Annual event specials 
 Comic-Con International
 Consumer Electronics Show
 E3

X-Play All Access 
 BlizzCon
 D.I.C.E. Summit
 Game Developers Conference
 Gamescom
 Interactive Achievement Awards
 Penny Arcade Expo
 QuakeCon
 Tokyo Game Show

Web shows

Former 
 Feedback
 Fighting Words
 First 15
 Fresh Ink Online
 Sessler's Soapbox
 Talkabouts
 Happy Tree Friends
 The MMO Report (2007–2012)
 The Electric Playground

Current 
 Facecheck Podcast (G4 Esports)
 Fresh Ink
 Full Screen Attack
 Saints & Sinners Podcast (G4 Esports)
 Sessler's Soapbox
 The Feedback w/ Fiona Nova
 Xplay Kickback

G-Spot shorts 
Most of these interstitial programs are AOTS and X-Play segments that aired outside the programs during some commercial breaks prior to May 20, 2012.
 Epic Fail - A segment showing viral videos of spectacular fails.
 The Feed - An AOTS host would give top stories in the gaming, tech, TV, and movie industry.
 Filter - In this condensed version, a host would give Top 3 lists, such as the Top 3 Video Gaming Vixens.
 G4 Urban Dictionary
 Game Break - News and views on the latest in the world of video games, as presented by the experts that rate them.
 Indie Games - Hosted by Kevin Pereira, this segment shows the latest independently-made video games.
 Morgan Minute - Hosted by Morgan Webb, this segment shows the latest games designed specifically for women.
 Tech Alert - This segment shows the latest and cool gadgets. These are rated on a scale of 1-5.
 We've Got Questions, You've Got Answers - The staff of G4 posts a question, and viewers take to their webcams for their responses.

References

 
G4